Westview is an unincorporated community in Breckinridge County, Kentucky, United States. Westview had a post office until it closed on August 2, 2008.

References

Unincorporated communities in Breckinridge County, Kentucky
Unincorporated communities in Kentucky